The Vita tripartita Sancti Patricii (The Tripartite Life of Saint Patrick) is a bilingual Life of Patrick, written partly in Irish and in parts in Latin. It is a hagiography focusing on Patrick. The text is difficult to date. Kathleen Mulchrone had assigned a late ninth century date based on the latest historical reference in the text. However, on linguistic grounds, it has been dated to as late as the twelfth century. The text as it stands probably reflects various stages of development. Máire Herbert summarises:

It was meant to be read in three parts over the three days of the Patrick's festival. James F. Kenney said that the Tripartite Life represents 'the evolution of the Patrick legend nearly completed.' While the Tripartite Life bears many similarities with earlier texts, and developed from them, the text as a whole is more brazen, and has a polemical character.

Editions and translations

 University of Frankfurt: in four parts

The Tripartite Life of Patrick: With Other Documents Relating to that Saint Vol. II

Further reading

References

History books about Christianity
Saint Patrick
Irish manuscripts
Christian manuscripts